Bir is the fifth studio album of Turkish heavy metal band Mezarkabul (also known as Pentagram). It is the band's first album with all lyrics in Turkish.

Track list

Band members
 Pentagram
 Murat İlkan - Vocals
 Hakan Utangaç - Guitar
 Metin Türkcan - Guitar
 Tarkan Gözübüyük - Bass guitars
 Cenk Ünnü - Drums

References 

Mezarkabul albums
2002 albums